Coscaga is a monotypic moth genus of the family Erebidae. Its only species, Coscaga picatalis, is found in Mexico. Both the genus and the species were first described by Schaus in 1906.

References

Herminiinae
Monotypic moth genera